Day of Days is a live album by Scottish Celtic rock band Runrig. The event at Stirling Castle celebrated their 30th anniversary, the band having been formed in 1973.

Track listing
 "Going Home" - 1:49
 "Hearthammer" - 5:09
 "Protect and Survive" - 5:07
 "Big Sky" - 7:41
 "Hearts of Olden Glory" - 4:57
 "Sìol Ghoraidh" (The Genealogy of Goraidh) - 5:53
 "Proterra" - 5:26
 "Running to the Light" - 5:02
 "The Stamping Ground" - 5:49
 "Maymorning" - 10:41
 "Faileas air an Àirigh" (Shadow on the Shieling) - 4:41
 "Book of Golden Stories" - 3:37
 "Day of Days" - 3:18
 "All the Miles" - 3:43
 "A Rèiteach" (The Betrothal) - 4:30

The album includes tracks from seven different studio albums:
 The Highland Connection (1979): "Going Home"
 The Cutter and the Clan (1987): "Protect and Survive" and "Hearts of Olden Glory"
 Searchlight (1989): "Sìol Ghoraidh"
 The Big Wheel (1991): "Hearthammer"
 In Search of Angels (1999): "Big Sky" and "Maymorning"
 The Stamping Ground (2001): "Running to the Light", "The Stamping Ground", and "Book of Golden Stories"
 Proterra (2003): "Proterra", "Faileas air an Àirigh"', "Day of Days", "All the Miles", and "A Rèiteach"

References 

Runrig albums
2004 live albums
Scottish Gaelic music